The 8th Australian Academy of Cinema and Television Arts Awards (generally known as the AACTA Awards) is an award ceremony to celebrate Australian films of 2018. The main ceremony was televised on Seven Network. First awards were presented on 3 December 2018.

Feature film

Television

Documentary and short film

References

External links
 Official AACTA website

AACTA Awards ceremonies
2018 film awards
2018 television awards
2018 in Australian cinema